Stewart Prosser is a British brass musician and arranger (The Style Council, Walk Upon England) and corporate communications strategist.

Career

Musician

As a musician, Stewart Prosser is a trumpet, flugelhorn and piccolo trumpet player and brass arranger who has worked in a wide range of styles – from jazz, to classical and pop – over the last 30 years. He was principal player of the Hampshire Youth Concert Band, before moving to London in 1980 and joining a number of pop, soul and jazz bands, including Rye and The Quarter Boys and The Big Sound Authority.

He spent much of the early to mid 1980s as Paul Weller's trumpet and flugelhorn player in The Style Council, playing on such number one-selling albums as Our Favourite Shop, as well as on singles, and touring and recording extensively with the band. He was featured as a soloist with The Style Council live on Le Départ. He toured with the band and was recorded live on videos released by Polydor Records and Polygram Video – Far East and Far Out and Showbiz.

He has supported a variety of pop and rock artists as a studio and live session musician (such as trumpet arrangement and player for Animal Nightlife on top 30 single Mr Solitaire) as well as playing on television theme tunes and brand advertising (trumpet session player on theme for television show Every Second Counts) and he is active in small group and big band jazz ensembles. Other trumpet sessions include I Can't Leave You Alone (Tracie Young), ABC (Direct Drive), ...Get Smart! (Squire).

Stewart and composer Damian Montagu have jointly developed the project Walk Upon England, which celebrates the countryside as a source of creativity in music and the spoken word. The first album, In A South Downs Way was released in June 2016 by Decca Records and reached No.1 in the Official UK Specialist Classical Charts. Earlier, in March 2016, the first single, "The Path towards Tomorrow" reached Number 1 in the UK Classical iTunes charts and has subsequently been played on BBC Radio 2, 3 and 4. It was also performed at the Glastonbury Festival. Stewart co-arranged and co-produced the album, and played trumpet and flugelhorn with his brass trio with trombonist Dave Gale and trumpeter Will Spencer. The premiere live performance of In A South Downs Way took place at the Minerva Theatre, Chichester, on 13 November 2016.

In addition to composing and arranging for brass, he is involved in music education, creating and running courses for young players in conjunction with schools.

Stewart is a Fellow of the Royal Society of Arts.

Corporate world

Stewart Prosser has also a 30 years career in the corporate world.  He has managed for 20 years corporate and financial communications strategies and functions for blue chip, multinational brands, including Lehman Brothers (Executive Director of Corporate Communications for Europe and Asia), AXA (Director of Corporate Affairs), The Royal Bank of Scotland (Head of Public Relations, Corporate and Institutional Banking) and JPMorgan Chase (Vice-President, Corporate Communications, EAME). In 2006, he founded Prosser Associates, where he offers advisory, strategic and practical support to executive teams and communications heads, in a variety of sectors.

He is a Fellow of the Chartered Institute of Public Relations.

References

1959 births
Living people
20th-century English musicians
21st-century English musicians
English trumpeters
Male trumpeters
21st-century trumpeters
20th-century British male musicians
20th-century British musicians
21st-century British male musicians